The Battle of Antivari or Action off Antivari was a naval engagement between a large fleet of French and British warships and two ships of the Austro-Hungarian navy at the start of the First World War. The old Austrian protected cruiser  and the destroyer  were blockading the Montenegrin port of Antivari, when on 16 August 1914, they were surprised and cut off by a large Anglo-French force that had sortied into the Adriatic. Zenta fought and was destroyed, to give Ulan a chance to escape, which she did. The ships of the Austrian fleet at Cattaro, unaware of events, did not come out of port to meet the Allied fleet. After blockading the Adriatic for a short while the French were forced to withdraw due to a lack of supplies.

Background
When war broke out between the Austro-Hungarian Empire and Montenegro, the Austro-Hungarians began a blockade of the Montenegrin coast as well as several bombardments of various towns including the port of Antivari (today Bar), where the protected cruiser SMS Zenta and destroyer SMS Ulan were stationed. The French Navy had decided to try to force the Austro-Hungarian Navy into a decisive fleet action by making a sortie into the Adriatic and bait the Austrians into engaging them. The Allied force consisted of two dreadnought battleships, 10 pre-dreadnought battleships, four armoured cruisers, one protected cruiser and more than 20 destroyers. According to Austro-Hungarian naval records, the main force of the Austro-Hungarian fleet was unaware of the Allied presence until SMS Ulan radioed them as she escaped from the battle.

Battle
The Allied Fleet managed to cut off Zenta from the main Austro-Hungarian naval base at Cattaro. Badly outnumbered, Zenta's commander, Captain Paul Pachner, decided to fight to allow Ulan to escape. Zenta also had a serious disadvantage because her 120 mm guns were significantly outranged by the heavier guns on the Allied ships. The French battleships scored many hits on Zenta without suffering any damage. Zenta was sunk with 173 men killed and over 50 wounded but the sacrifice enabled Ulan to escape.

Aftermath
Unaware of the situation outside Antivari until it was virtually over, that part of the Austro-Hungarian fleet stationed at Cattaro did not sortie to give battle as the French had hoped. French ships were not damaged by Austrian gunfire however 3 major guns exploded while firing, and the following day Justice, Démocratie, and two destroyers were damaged in a series of collisions.  
The action ended the Austro-Hungarian blockade of Montenegro which was a success for the Entente. The French fleet could not remain in the Adriatic for long and had to return to Malta periodically for supplies.

Order of battle

French Navy
 , dreadnought battleship, flagship
 , dreadnought battleship
 1st Battle squadron
 , pre-dreadnought battleship, Division Flagship
 , pre-dreadnought battleship
 , pre-dreadnought battleship, Squadron Flagship
 , pre-dreadnought battleship
 , pre-dreadnought battleship
 2nd Battle squadron
 , pre-dreadnought battleship, Squadron Flagship
 , pre-dreadnought battleship
 , pre-dreadnought battleship
 , pre-dreadnought battleship, Division Flagship
 , pre-dreadnought battleship
 1st Light Division
 , armoured cruiser
 , armoured cruiser
 2nd Light Division
 , armoured cruiser
 , armoured cruiser
 , protected cruiser
 3 Destroyer Squadrons

Royal Navy
 , armoured cruiser
 , armoured cruiser
 4 Destroyers

Austro-Hungarian Navy
 Blockade Force
 , protected cruiser
 , destroyer
 Auxiliary Force
  (1895)
  (1885)
 2 Destroyers

Notes

References

Further reading
 

Conflicts in 1914
Naval battles of World War I involving Austria-Hungary
Naval battles of World War I involving France
Battles involving Austria
Naval battles of World War I involving the United Kingdom
Mediterranean naval operations of World War I
Bar, Montenegro
August 1914 events